Hairy Maclary and Friends is a series of children's picture books created by New Zealand author and illustrator Dame Lynley Dodd. The popular series has sold over five million copies worldwide.
The character Hairy Maclary made his first appearance in 1983 in the book titled Hairy Maclary from Donaldson's Dairy. He is the protagonist in twelve books in the series, and there are a further nine books about his friends.

Hairy Maclary's adventures are usually in the company of his other animal friends who include the dachshund Schnitzel von Krumm, the Dalmatian Bottomley Potts, greyhound-cross Bitzer Maloney, mastiff Hercules Morse and Old English sheepdog Muffin McLay. The series also features cats Scarface Claw, their formidable opponent, and Slinky Malinki.

According to the books' website, Hairy Maclary is "a small dog of mixed pedigree".

Description 

Hairy Maclary books are designed to be read by an adult to a child. The plots are simple, keeping with the comprehension-level of the age group for which they are written. They generally involve Hairy and his friends in adventurous scenarios pitched against local cats. The animals in this series, unlike the creatures of Beatrix Potter's stories, are not given human thoughts and motives, their actions tell the stories, and reflect their animal natures.

Each double-sided page has an illustration on one side, and text on the other. The pictures and the written words together tell the story, and the illustrations and their meanings are as important as the text. The books have a wide format that enables a child seated beside an adult to have a full view of the picture page while the adult reads.

The text is written in rhythmic verse that flows easily with simple rhymes like "Bottomley Potts covered in spots, Hercules Morse as big as a horse". Characters, events and therefore language are repetitive and cumulative, in the manner of "Old MacDonald had a farm". Each book contains a twist or some sort of conclusion at the end. The repetitions permit a young child to anticipate what is coming next and repeat the words. 
"Schnitzel von Krumm 
with a very low tum, 
Bitzer Maloney 
all skinny and bony, 
Muffin McLay 
like a bundle of hay, 
Bottomley Potts 
covered in spots, 
Hercules Morse 
as big as a horse
and Hairy Maclary 
from Donaldson's Dairy" Although the books are designed to entertain young children, they are not intended as "early readers", as are, for example, the "Cat in the Hat" books by Dr. Seuss which have a very basic and largely phonic vocabulary. The Hairy Maclary books, despite their simple stories, introduce the listening child to some long but very expressive words, which are not part of the average preschooler vocabulary but must be understood by the child in the context in which they occur. For example, the noise made by a stranded cat and the excited dogs who discover it is described as a "cacophony".

Lynley Dodd's illustrations are closely observed from life. The breeds of dogs, the types of houses and the plants growing in each garden can generally be identified. The stories seem to exist in a real suburb in the real world. Hairy Maclary's home, for example, has a red corrugated iron roof supported on wooden brackets, and the garden has a frangipani tree, a picket fence and a row of agapanthi. Each picture promotes investigation and discussion between the child and the reader, as events unfold in the pictures which are not described in the text. In the first book of the series the repeated lines "...and Hairy Maclary from Donaldson's Dairy" accompany a series of illustrations showing Hairy Maclary sniffing the bottom of a lamppost, burrowing into a hedge, barking at some birds and raiding a garbage can. Close observation is encouraged by the inclusion in many of the pictures of a tiny glimpse of the dog who has been named on the previous page, as it approaches or walks out of the picture, showing only the point of a nose or the tip of a tail.

Adaptations and legacy
In the 1990s, a TV series featuring ten five-minute episodes based on the series premiered. In 2015 a sculpture of Hairy Maclary and other characters from the books was officially unveiled in Tauranga on the waterfront by former prime minister John Key. In the 2019 TVNZ series Goodnight Kiwi the prime minister Jacinda Ardern read Hairy Maclary from Donaldson's Dairy; the episode aired on TVNZ 2 on Christmas Day.

References

External links 
Hairy Maclary on Facebook
Hairy Maclary at Penguin Books New Zealand
Hairy-Macclary at Puffin Books Australia

Book series introduced in 1983
Picture books
Series of children's books
Characters in children's literature
Books about dogs
Animal tales
New Zealand children's literature
Hairy Maclary